AfrikaBurn is an official Burning Man regional event, held at Quaggafontein ( "fountain of Quagga") in the Tankwa Karoo, in the Western Cape Province of South Africa. It is centred on the building of a temporary creative community in a semi-desert environment, involving ephemeral artworks, some of which are burnt towards the end of the event. Many attendees wear elaborate costumes and some create decorated "mutant vehicles".

History
Africa Burns Creative Projects (AfrikaBurn) was established in 2007 as a not-for-profit company, with the intention that it would serve as a vehicle for the creation and co-ordination of an independent South African Burning Man regional event. AfrikaBurn was originally conceived by Paul Jorgensen.

Paul Jorgensen had attended several Burning Man festivals and become good friends with Larry Harvey and the Burner family, he had come out to South Africa to see his parents and with the express intention of creating an artistic platform to unite and bring together his fellow South Africans on a playground without politic. His friend from school Robert Weinek (aka Miss Nesbitt) was the natural choice for collaborator. With his fabulous art and gallery background and experience as a cultural agitator, he was the perfect foil to marry Paul's energy with the "mandate" from Larry to get things burning here in Africa. Robert Weinek reached out to Liane Visser, realising that her intimate knowledge of the local art scene and experience as an outdoor promoter and party designer would be the perfect catalyst. Over a dinner at Malplaas the initial plan was hatched between the three cultural alchemists.......many of the early concepts like the "Binnekring" and "Buitekring" and the delightful inclusion of Afrikaans as the "official" lexicon were conceived of that night. It took nearly two years of behind the scenes knitting and weaving by these three, before the first event took place.

A special mention should also be made for the energy, input and inspiration of Charlie Blackcat Smith, Paul Grose, John Allesandri, Harry Logos, Simon Dunckley and Jutta Holzapfel who helped coddle the little spark into the flame that it has become.

The company's founding members were Paul Jorgensen, Robert Weinek and Liane Visser, Mike 't Sas-Rolfes (a special mention should be made of Michael's mom whose energy and support helped create the first mini-burn at Roberts house in Somerset West) along with Richard Bowsher and Monique Schiess.

The event has been running since 2007, with all events up to 2019 held on a private farm called Stonehenge, which is adjacent to the Tankwa Karoo National Park. Late in 2019, two adjacent properties - Quaggafontein and Vaalfontein were gifted to AfrikaBurn by the Mapula Trust. Quaggafontein (as both farms are now collectively known) is located 30 km southeast of Stonehenge Private Reserve as the crow flies, below Skoorsteenberg mountain.

Much like Stonehenge, Quaggafontein is very isolated, and the property is within the Western Cape provincial boundary and features one portion characterised by a high degree of biodiversity and vulnerable flora and fauna species (which will be off-limits in order to preserve these species) and another that is characterised by degradation (which would be appropriate for the event site).

The event was originally called Afrika Burns, however owing to concerns about the name having possible negative connotations the name was changed through community consultation to AfrikaBurn, from something that happens ('burns') to Africa, to something that happens (a 'burn') in Africa.

In 2010 the dates of the annual event were moved to earlier in the year, as autumn weather is better suited to the event, and it is currently possible for a public holiday (or in some years two public holidays) to be included within the week during which the event runs. It also means that it is not so close to Burning Man, to allow for more international participants.

Each event mobilises around a theme, which is intended as a point of possible connection, or inspiration. The theme is not imposed on artworks, projects or gifts.

The current Executive Director of the organisation is Lorraine Tanner. The Non Executive Directors are: Ralph Borland, Malilimalo Phaswana, Rianna Postma, Roger Van Wyk, Lungile Zakwe and Nic Raubenheimer.

San Clan

By analogy to the Man at Burning Man, the main sculpture at the event is called the San Clan. It is designed to look like a San rock art glyph of a group of people. The intention is to convey the idea of unity and community at the event. Like some sculptures at the event, it is burnt. The burn used to take place on the Saturday night, but is now scheduled for Friday nights in order to accommodate weather delays and provide participants from far afield with more time to return home from the event. The original signifier, that of the many headed dancing clan spirit was first championed by Liane Visser.

Culture

As a regional Burning Man event, AfrikaBurn adheres to the ten principles of Burning Man and added another in 2014.  Among these guiding principles are the Leave No Trace philosophy, radical self-expression and self-reliance, and communal effort. The 11th principle, 'Each One Teach One', was added to encourage the sharing of knowledge throughout the community, in order to ensure the uptake of culture matches the growth in numbers. Money is not allowed on the camping site of the event since nothing is for sale, if people need something they either trade it with something else or simply ask for it and thereby employing a gift economy.

In April 2019, the content of the Radical Inclusion principle was modified to "address [...] systemic injustice". An "inclusivity guide" was added with information on "racism, micro-aggressions, white privilege and fragility".

Pets are not allowed at the event. This is due to concerns for the safety of both the animals (loud noises and an inhospitable environment), and the participants. In addition, fireworks, flares and fire lanterns are not permitted.

Theme camps are one of the key components of vibrant regional Burning Man events.  Theme camps are established by participants to enhance the experience for all participants.

Major theme camps from the last few years include "Alienz Coffee Shop", "BeDazzled", "Birthday Suits", "Burning Mail", "Camp Anvil", "Camp High Tea", "Camp Skaduwee", "Desert Magic", "Flow Arts Commune", "Fractal Chill Ethiopian Coffee House", "Love All Tennis", "Magical Mystery Mob", "New Beginnings", "Camp Now!", "Rust 'n Dust", "Smokescreen", "Space Cowboys", "State of Bliss", "Sunset Oasis", "The Emperor's New Theme Camp", "The Friend Zone", "The Grease Monkeys", "The Pancake People", "The Purple Spanking Booth", "The Steampunk Saloon", "The Tankwa Town Library", "The Theatre of Playful Banter", "The Vuvustasie", "The Wild Ass Saloon" and "WeR1 Soulstice". Each year, the number of Theme Camps grows in line with the increase in numbers.

"MOOP", or Matter Out Of Place, is the term for litter. Reducing and removing MOOP is part of the Leave No Trace philosophy.

AfrikaBurn also has its own community radio station, Radio Free Tankwa that originated from a theme camp (Radio ARRR). That broadcasts throughout the year online.

Notes

References

External links
 AfrikaBurn Website

Burning Man
Arts festivals in South Africa
Clothing-optional events
2007 establishments in South Africa
Recurring events established in 2007